USS LST-464/LST(H)-464 was a United States Navy  used in the Asiatic-Pacific Theater during World War II.

Construction
LST-464 was laid down on 10 October 1942, under Maritime Commission (MARCOM) contract, MC hull 984, by Kaiser Shipyards, Vancouver, Washington; launched 12 November 1942; and commissioned on 25 February 1943.

LST-464 was converted into a "first aid ship" at Sydney, Australia, in 1943. These modifications included the installation in the tank deck bulkhead of a watertight door to allow access to the forward troop compartment from both the starboard and port sides of the ship. Spaces were also converted to receiving, sterilizer, and operating rooms. On the tank deck, 78 hospital beds, refrigerators, lockers, toilets and wash basins were installed. LST-464s medical staff was increased to six doctors, one dentist and a number of corpsmen.

Service history
During the war, LST-464 was assigned to the Asiatic-Pacific Theater. She took part in supporting and consolidations designated by Commander 7th Fleet from May through October 1944; and the Leyte operation in October and November 1944.

Post-war service
Following the war, LST-464 was redesignated LST(H)-464 on 15 September, and performed occupation duty in the Far East until late September 1945. The tank landing ship returned to the United States and was decommissioned on 16 April 1946, and struck from the Navy list on 19 June 1946. On 5 March 1948, she was sold to the Port Houston Iron Works, Inc., of Houston, Texas, for non-self-propelled operation.

Honors and awards
LST-464 earned two battle stars and the Navy Unit Commendation for her World War II service.

Notes 

Citations

Bibliography 

Online resources

External links

 

1942 ships
World War II amphibious warfare vessels of the United States
LST-1-class tank landing ships of the United States Navy
S3-M2-K2 ships
Ships built in Vancouver, Washington